T. J. Anderson (born 1928) is an American composer. 

T. J. Anderson may also refer to:

Thomas J. Anderson (judge) (1837–1910), Justice of the Territorial Utah Supreme Court
T. J. Anderson (rugby union) (born 1987), Irish rugby union player
Tyler John Anderson (born 1989), baseball pitcher
Timothy J. Anderson (fl. 1980s–2010s), writer, classical singer, actor and composer
Tim Anderson (defensive tackle) (born 1980), American football defensive tackle